The 2018 F4 Japanese Championship season was the fourth season of the F4 Japanese Championship. It began on 7 April in Okayama and finished on 11 November on Twin Ring Motegi after seven double header rounds.

Teams and drivers
All teams and drivers were Japanese-registered

Race calendar and results
All rounds were held in Japan and were part of the Super GT events.

Championship standings

Points are awarded as follows:

Drivers' standings

Teams' standings

Independent Cup Standings

References

External links
  

Japanese F4 Championship seasons
Japanese
F4 Japanese Championship
Japanese Formula 4